Kincaid is a city in Anderson County, Kansas, United States.  As of the 2020 census, the population of the city was 103.

History
Kincaid was founded in 1885. It was named for Robert Kincaid, of Mound City.

Geography
Kincaid is located at  (38.083502, -95.153612).

Area events
The Kincaid Free Fair is an annual three-day event that began in 1908 and features a carnival, a Saturday parade, turtle races, kids races, live entertainment, and Fair Queen contest.

Demographics

2010 census
As of the census of 2010, there were 122 people, 56 households, and 30 families residing in the city. The racial makeup of the city was 96.7% White, 0.8% Native American, 0.8% Asian, and 1.6% from two or more races. Hispanic or Latino of any race were 1.6% of the population.

There were 56 households, of which 28.6% had children under the age of 18 living with them, 41.1% were married couples living together, 8.9% had a female householder with no husband present, 3.6% had a male householder with no wife present, and 46.4% were non-families. 41.1% of all households were made up of individuals, and 16.1% had someone living alone who was 65 years of age or older. The average household size was 2.18 and the average family size was 3.00.

The median age in the city was 48.3 years. 19.7% of residents were under the age of 18; 9% were between the ages of 18 and 24; 14.8% were from 25 to 44; 35.2% were from 45 to 64; and 21.3% were 65 years of age or older. The gender makeup of the city was 52.5% male and 47.5% female.

2000 census
As of the census of 2000, there were 178 people, 73 households, and 41 families residing in the city. The racial makeup of the city was 94.38% White, 4.49% Native American, 1.12% from other races. Hispanic or Latino of any race were 2.81% of the population.

There were 73 households, out of which 24.7% had children under the age of 18 living with them, 42.5% were married couples living together, 11.0% had a female householder with no husband present, and 43.8% were non-families. 39.7% of all households were made up of individuals, and 23.3% had someone living alone who was 65 years of age or older. The average household size was 2.44 and the average family size was 3.34.

In the city, the population was spread out, with 23.0% under the age of 18, 7.9% from 18 to 24, 23.0% from 25 to 44, 23.6% from 45 to 64, and 22.5% who were 65 years of age or older. The median age was 43 years. For every 100 females, there were 111.9 males. For every 100 females age 18 and over, there were 107.6 males.

The median income for a household in the city was $22,857, and the median income for a family was $29,375. Males had a median income of $20,694 versus $14,500 for females. The per capita income for the city was $9,472. About 7.0% of families and 11.1% of the population were below the poverty line, including none of those under the age of eighteen and 4.9% of those 65 or over.

Government
The Kincaid consists of a mayor and five council members.  The council meets the 2nd Monday of each month at 7PM.
 City Hall, 500 5th Ave.

Education
Kincaid is part of Unified School District 479. The district high school is Crest High School.

See also
 List of Grand Army of the Republic Posts in Kansas

References

Further reading

External links

 Kincaid - Directory of Public Officials
 USD 479, school district for Colony, Kincaid
 Numerous Anderson County documents and photos
 Kincaid city map, KDOT

Cities in Kansas
Cities in Anderson County, Kansas
1885 establishments in Kansas
Populated places established in 1885